was a village located in Minamitsugaru District in central Aomori Prefecture, Japan.

Ikarigaseki was founded on April 1, 1889.

On January 1, 2006, Ikarigaseki, along with the towns of Hiraka and Onoe (all from Minamitsugaru District), was merged to create the new city of Hirakawa, and thus no longer exists as an independent municipality.

At the time of its merger, Ikarigaseki had an estimated population of 3,140 and a population density of 29.8 persons per km². The total area was 105.33 km².

Ikarigaseki was served by National Routes 7 and 282 as well as an interchange on the Tōhoku Expressway. Train service was provided by Tsugaru-Yunosawa Station and Ikarigaseki Station on the Ōu Main Line.

Climate

References

Dissolved municipalities of Aomori Prefecture
Hirakawa, Aomori